Rabab Hashim is a Pakistani television actress and host. She made her acting debut with Na Kaho Tum Mere Nahi. She has played a role of Rukhi in Hum TV's acclaimed series Zid. She is also known for her leading roles in Piya Mann Bhaye, Anaya Tumhari Hui, Ishqaaway, Mannat, Marzi, Aik Thi Misaal, Kam Zarf and Meray Mohsin. In addition to acting, Hashim has appeared as a host and anchor in a few television programmes and sports shows. She also hosted the Social Diaries telecasted on TV One.

Early life
Rabab Hashim (often spelled as Rubab) was born in Karachi, Pakistan. She received her BBA (Hons.) with majors in  Marketing from the Institute of Business Management (IBM), Karachi and received her formal training in theater arts from National Academy of Performing Arts (Pakistan) by graduating from there with full honors. She got married in November 2020.

Career 
She made her television debut as a child reporter for Geo TV at age 10. Her first acting debut on TV was with the Hum TV's, Na Kaho Tum Mere Nahi where she worked with Ahsan Khan and Saba Qamar and other senior actors. It was followed by a number of drama series, most recently Ishqaaway and Mannat. As of now, she is one of the leading actresses in Pakistan. In addition to acting and appearing in a number of commercials as a model, she has appeared as a host or anchor in a few TV programs and sports shows, including a sports show "Khelo aur Jeeto" on Geo Super and the T20 World Cup transmissions (ICC World Twenty20).

Filmography

Television

Web series

Short films

References

External links 
 
 

21st-century Pakistani actresses
Living people
Pakistani female models
Pakistani television actresses
Pakistani television hosts
Pakistani women television presenters
Year of birth missing (living people)